Halifax County Courthouse is a historic county courthouse located at Halifax, Halifax County, Virginia.  It was designed and built in 1838-1839 by Dabney Cosby.  It is a two-story, "T"-shaped brick building in the Federal style. The front facade features a two-story, tetrastyle portico in the Greek Ionic order.

It was listed on the National Register of Historic Places in 1982. It is located in the Town of Halifax Court House Historic District.

References

Courthouses on the National Register of Historic Places in Virginia
Federal architecture in Virginia
Government buildings completed in 1839
Buildings and structures in Halifax County, Virginia
County courthouses in Virginia
National Register of Historic Places in Halifax County, Virginia
Individually listed contributing properties to historic districts on the National Register in Virginia